Malvani may refer to:
Malvani people of Maharashtra, on the western coast of India
Malvani language
Malad Culture

Language and nationality disambiguation pages